Professor Jonathan Sprent, is an Australian immunologist. His research has focused on the formation and activation of T cell leukocytes, and methods to overcome T cell-mediated rejection of transplanted tissue.

Awards
1995: J. Allyn Taylor International Prize in Medicine
1998: Fellow of the Royal Society
2003: Errol Solomon Meyers Memorial Lecture
2006: Fellow of the Australian Academy of Science
2015: American Association of Immunologists Lifetime Achievement Award
2017: National Academy of Sciences (Immunology)

He is an honorary member of the British Society for Immunology.

References

Living people
Australian immunologists
Fellows of the Australian Academy of Science
Australian Fellows of the Royal Society
Year of birth missing (living people)